Patrick Hürlimann (born 9 July 1963) is a Swiss curler, Olympic champion, and Vice-President of the World Curling Federation (WCF). He received a gold medal at the 1998 Winter Olympics in Nagano. 
He has received three medals at the World Curling Championships as skip for the Swiss team.

As head of the Marketing and Communications Committee of the WCF, Patrick Hürlimann developed the system of points used for the ranking of nations that participate in international curling bonspiels.

In 2010, Hürlimann became Vice-President of the WCF. Hürlimann was inducted into the WCF Hall of Fame in 2014.

Hürlimann is married to fellow curler Janet Hürlimann.

References

1963 births
Living people
Swiss male curlers
Olympic curlers of Switzerland
Curlers at the 1998 Winter Olympics
Olympic gold medalists for Switzerland
Olympic medalists in curling
Medalists at the 1998 Winter Olympics
20th-century Swiss people